Hasanabad-e Yek (also Romanized as Ḩasanābād-e Yek; also known as Ḩasanābād and Hasan Abad Zargham) is a village in Ganjabad Rural District, Esmaili District, Anbarabad County, Kerman Province, Iran. At the 2006 census, its population was 369, in 76 families.

References 

Populated places in Anbarabad County